Faerie Tale Theatre (also known as Shelley Duvall's Faerie Tale Theatre) is an American live-action fairytale fantasy drama anthology television series of 27 episodes, that originally aired on Showtime from September 11, 1982 until November 14, 1987. It is a retelling of 26 fairy tales, particularly those written by The Brothers Grimm, Charles Perrault and Hans Christian Andersen, an additional episode is based on the poem  "The Pied Piper of Hamelin". 

The 27th episode was a reunion episode of cast and crew titled "Grimm Party", in which in Fairytale style, celebrating the series they attended a gala in fancy dress.

The series follow a similar style to an earlier series narrated by Shirley Temple, titled Shirley Temple's Storybook, that ran from 1958 and 1961 and also featured numerous Hollywood stars in roles.

Series background 

Actress Shelley Duvall who conceived the series, served as executive producer and host alongside associate producers Bridget Terry and Fred Fuchs, she also occasionally starred in episodes and was a featured narrator, as well as providing the voice of the animatronic Nightingale, in the episode of the same title.

Episodes were directed by Francis Ford Coppola, Ivan Passer, Emile Ardolino and Tim Burton, among others and featured numerous Hollywood performers in iconic roles. 

The series was one of the first examples of original cable programming, alongside HBO's Fraggle Rock.

The series was followed by three other less successful shorter anthologies also produced by Duvall: Tall Tales & Legends (9 episodes), which follows the same format as Faerie Tale Theatre and focuses on classic American folk tales, Nightmare Classics (4 episodes produced of the intended 6), aimed at a young adult audience, and Bedtime Stories (12 episodes).

Duvall began conception of Faerie Tale Theatre while filming the live-action 1980 film Popeye in Malta. She reportedly asked her co-star, Robin Williams, his opinion on "The Frog Prince", a fairy tale she was reading during production. Williams thought it was funny and would later star in the namesake pilot episode of the series, written, narrated and directed by Monty Python's Eric Idle, who himself would appear in the future episode "The Pied Piper of Hamelin". Many of the episodes produced by Fred Fuchs in association with Duvall, were written by Rod Ash, Mark Curtiss, Maryedith Burrell and Robert C. Jones. All of the episodes were produced and shot from 1982 to 1985 and videotaped mostly at the ABC Television Studios in Hollywood, California.

Every episode opened with Duvall introducing herself and giving a brief synopsis of the fairy tale to follow. Each episode features live-action adaptations, with celebrities from the performance world in costume. Duvall features in three episodes playing various characters and narrates three others.

Episodes

Artwork
Many episodes feature backdrops and settings inspired by specific artists and children's book illustrators, including

Home media
Faerie Tale Theatre was released on VHS, Betamax, CED, and Laserdisc in the 1980s through mid 1990s, initially by CBS/FOX Video (which was also in Australia.), followed by Playhouse Video (an extended label under CBS/FOX), and later Razz Ma Tazz Entertainment/Cabin Fever Entertainment. While in the UK, it was released by MGM-UA Home Video.

Starmaker II held the rights to the series from 2004 to 2006, and at first released 26 episodes as individual DVDs. This was followed by a double-sided 4-disc box set and then a 6-disc box set, each version containing the same 26 episodes. The "Greatest Moments" episode was not included in this release.

After 2006, Koch Vision held the series' distribution rights, and in November 2006 licensed the rights worldwide (excluding DVDs in North America) to the British company 3DD Entertainment. A new remastered 7-disc box set, including the lost "Greatest Moments" episode, was released by Koch Vision on September 2, 2008. In 2009, Koch Vision released the episodes by theme on six DVD compilations: Tales from the Brothers Grimm ("Hansel and Gretel", "Rapunzel", "Rumpelstiltskin", and "Little Red Riding Hood"), Funny Tales ("The Tale of The Frog Prince", "Pinocchio", "The Three Little Pigs" and "The Princess Who Had Never Laughed"), Tales from Hans Christian Andersen ("The Emperor's New Clothes", "The Nightingale", "The Snow Queen" and "Thumbelina"), Princess Tales ("Cinderella", "The Little Mermaid", "The Dancing Princesses" and "The Princess and the Pea"), Magical Tales ("Aladdin and His Wonderful Lamp", "Beauty and the Beast", "Puss in Boots" and "Snow White and the Seven Dwarfs") and Bedtime Tales ("Jack and the Beanstalk", "Sleeping Beauty", "Rip Van Winkle" and "Goldilocks and the Three Bears").

When released on DVD by Starmaker II and Koch Vision, the following scenes were cut from the series:

"Goldilocks and the Three Bears": Papa Bear and Mama Bear trying to fix Cubby Bear's chair; the Charades scene is shortened.
"The Pied Piper of Hamelin": Julius Caesar Rat's monologue.
"Rumpelstiltskin": the Miller's daughter singing with the animals in the forest (this scene was also unavailable on the VHS releases)

Awards
Faerie Tale Theatre won a Peabody Award, a TCA Award, and a Golden CableACE Award. It later aired as edited re-runs on the Disney Channel as well as in syndication on various television stations, including PBS and BookTelevision.

International broadcast
In the United States, The series was first shown on Showtime in 1982, and again It aired on Disney Channel between 1994 and 1996.
In Italy, The series aired on Rai 1 every weekend in 1990, and again in 1991 and 1992 in the morning under the title "Nel regno delle fiable", meaning "In the Kingdom of Fairy Tales" in Italian.
In Brazil, The series aired on TV Cultura.
In Hong Kong, The series aired on ATV World every saturday.
In Mexico, The series aired on Canal 5.
In India, The series aired on DD National.
In Malaysia, The series aired on TV2.
In Bulgaria, The series aired on BNT 2.
In the Philippines, The series aired on an unnamed Philippine network.
In Bangladesh, the series aired on Bangladesh Television.
In Sri Lanka, the series aired on Rupavahini.

See also
Cannon Movie Tales
Mother Goose Rock 'n' Rhyme
Shirley Temple's Storybook
Tall Tales & Legends
Happily Ever After: Fairy Tales for Every Child
The Fairytaler

References

External links 
 
 

1982 American television series debuts
1987 American television series endings
1980s American children's television series
1980s American anthology television series
1980s American drama television series
American children's fantasy television series
English-language television shows
Television about magic
Peabody Award-winning television programs
Showtime (TV network) original programming
RAI original programming
Television shows based on fairy tales
Television series by Gaylord Entertainment Company
Witchcraft in television